The Treason Act 1586 (29 Eliz.1 c.2) was an Act of the Parliament of England. Its short title was "An act concerning errors in records of attainders of high treason." It stated that where a person had been executed for high treason, their conviction was not to be posthumously overturned or "reversed" at the suit of their heirs. This was because (according to the Act's preamble) "through corruption or negligent keeping, the records of attainders of treason happen many times to be impaired, blemished or otherwise to be defective." The Act was intended to prevent people from taking advantage of this.

The Act did not apply to any writ of error which had already been brought, or affect any record which had already been reversed.

References
Statutes at Large, vol. V, Danby Pickering, Cambridge University Press, 1765.

See also
High treason in the United Kingdom
Treason Act

Treason in England
Acts of the Parliament of England (1485–1603)
1586 in law
16th century in England